A product distribution is a probability distribution constructed as the distribution of the product of random variables having two other known distributions. Given two statistically independent random variables X and Y, the distribution of the random variable Z that is formed as the product  is a product distribution.

Algebra of random variables 

The product is one type of algebra for random variables: Related to the product distribution are the ratio distribution, sum distribution (see List of convolutions of probability distributions) and difference distribution. More generally, one may talk of combinations of sums, differences, products and ratios.

Many of these distributions are described in Melvin D. Springer's book from 1979 The Algebra of Random Variables.

Derivation for independent random variables

Proof 

We first write the cumulative distribution function of  starting with its definition

Since  on the right hand side,   appears only in the integration limits, the derivative is easily performed using the  fundamental theorem of calculus and the chain rule. (Note the negative sign that is needed when the variable occurs in the lower limit of the integration.)

 

where the absolute value is used to conveniently combine the two terms.

Alternate proof
A faster more compact proof begins with the same step of writing the cumulative distribution of  starting with its definition:

 

 

where we utilize the translation and scaling properties of the Dirac delta function .

A more intuitive description of the procedure is illustrated in the figure below.  The joint pdf  exists in the - plane and an arc of constant  value is shown as the shaded line.  To find the marginal probability   on this arc, integrate over increments of area  on this contour.

Since  implies , we can relate the probability increment to the -increment, namely .

A Bayesian interpretation

Let  be a random sample drawn from probability distribution .  Scaling  by  generates a sample from scaled distribution  which can be written as a conditional distribution  .

Letting  be a random variable with pdf , the distribution of the scaled sample becomes  and integrating out  we get  so  is drawn from this distribution .  However, substituting the definition of  we also  have
 which has the same form as the product distribution above.

Therefore  .

Expectation of product of random variables 

When two random variables are statistically independent, the expectation of their product is the product of their expectations. This can be proved from the law of total expectation:

In the inner expression,  is a constant. Hence:

Hence:

Variance of the product of independent random variables 

Let  be uncorrelated random variables with means  and variances .

In the case of the product of more than two variables, if  are statistically independent then the variance of their product is

Characteristic function of product of random variables 

Assume X, Y are independent random variables. Then from the law of total expectation, we have

If the characteristic functions and distributions of both X and Y are known, then alternatively,  also holds.

Mellin transform

The inverse transform is

if  are two independent random samples from different distributions, then the Mellin transform of their product is equal to the product of their Mellin transforms:
 

If s is restricted to integer values, a simpler result is

The pdf of a function can be reconstructed from its moments using the saddlepoint approximation method.

A further result is that for independent X, Y

Gamma distribution example To illustrate how the product of moments yields a much simpler result than finding the moments of the distribution of the product, let  be sampled from two Gamma distributions,  with parameters 
whose moments are 

Multiplying the corresponding moments gives the Mellin transform result

Independently, it is known that the product of two independent Gamma-distributed samples (~Gamma(α,1) and Gamma(β,1)) has a K-distribution:

To find the moments of this, make the change of variable , simplifying similar integrals to:

thus

The definite integral 
 is well documented and we have finally

 

which, after some difficulty, has agreed with the moment product result above.

If X, Y are drawn independently from Gamma distributions with shape parameters  then 

This type of result is universally true, since for bivariate independent variables  thus

or equivalently it is clear that  are independent variables.

Special cases

Lognormal distributions
The distribution of the product of two random variables which have lognormal distributions is again lognormal. This is itself a special case of a more general set of results where the logarithm of the product can be written as the sum of the logarithms. Thus, in cases where a simple result can be found in the list of convolutions of probability distributions, where the distributions to be convolved are those of the logarithms of the components of the product, the result might be transformed to provide the distribution of the product. However this approach is only useful where the logarithms of the components of the product are in some standard families of distributions.

Uniformly distributed independent random variables
Let  be the product of two independent variables  each uniformly distributed on the interval  [0,1], possibly the outcome of a copula transformation.  As noted in "Lognormal Distributions" above, PDF convolution operations in the Log domain correspond to the product of sample values in the original domain. Thus, making the transformation , such that , each variate is distributed independently on u as 
.
and the convolution of the two distributions is the autoconvolution

Next retransform the variable to  yielding the distribution

  on the interval [0,1]

For the product of multiple (> 2) independent samples the characteristic function route is favorable. Note that  so the Jacobian of the transformation is unity.

The convolution of  independent samples from  therefore has CF  which is known to be the CF of a Gamma distribution of shape :
.

Making the inverse transformation  we get the PDF of the product of the n samples:

The following, more conventional, derivation from Stackexchange is consistent with this result.
First of all, letting  its CDF is

 

The density of 

Multiplying by a third independent sample gives distribution function

 
Taking the derivative yields

The author of the note conjectures that, in general, 

The figure illustrates the nature of the integrals above.  The shaded area within the unit square and below the line z = xy, represents the CDF of z.  This divides into two parts.  The first is for 0 < x < z where the increment of area in the vertical slot is just equal to dx.  The second part lies below the xy line, has y-height z/x, and incremental area dx z/x.

Independent central-normal distributions
The product of two independent Normal samples follows a modified Bessel function.
Then 

The variance of this distribution could be determined, in principle, by a definite integral from Gradsheyn and Ryzhik,  

thus

A much simpler result, stated in a section above, is that the variance of the product of zero-mean independent samples is equal to the product of their variances.  Since the variance of each Normal sample is one, the variance of the product is also one.

Correlated central-normal distributions
The product of correlated Normal samples case was recently addressed by Nadarajaha and Pogány. 
Let  be zero mean, unit variance, normally distributed variates with correlation coefficient 

Then

Mean and variance:  For the mean we have  from the definition of correlation coefficient.  The variance can be found by transforming from two unit variance zero mean uncorrelated variables U, V. Let

Then  X, Y are unit variance variables with correlation coefficient  and 

Removing odd-power terms, whose expectations are obviously zero, we get

Since  we have

High correlation asymptote
In the highly correlated case,  the product converges on the square of one sample. In this case the  asymptote is 
and 
 
which is a Chi-squared distribution with one degree of freedom.

Multiple correlated samples.

where W is the Whittaker function while .

Using the identity , see for example the DLMF compilation. eqn(13.13.9), this expression can be somewhat simplified to

The pdf gives the distribution of a sample covariance.  The approximate distribution of a correlation coefficient can be found via the Fisher transformation.

Multiple non-central correlated samples.  The distribution of the product of correlated non-central normal samples was derived by Cui et al. and takes the form of an infinite series of modified Bessel functions of the first kind.

Moments of product of correlated central normal samples

For a central normal distribution N(0,1) the moments are 
 
where  denotes the double factorial.

If  are central correlated variables, the simplest bivariate case of the multivariate normal moment problem described by Kan, then

 

where
 is the correlation coefficient and 
[needs checking]

Correlated non-central normal distributions
The distribution of the product of non-central correlated normal samples was derived by Cui et al. and takes the form of an infinite series.

These product distributions are somewhat comparable to the Wishart distribution. The latter is the joint distribution of the four elements (actually only three independent elements) of a sample covariance matrix.

Independent complex-valued central-normal distributions
Let  be independent samples from a normal(0,1) distribution.  Setting 
 are independent zero-mean complex normal samples with circular symmetry.  Their complex variances are 

The density functions of

 are Rayleigh distributions defined as:

The variable  is clearly Chi-squared with two degrees of freedom and has PDF

Thus the polar representation of the product of two uncorrelated complex Gaussian samples is
.

The first and second moments of this distribution can be found from the integral in Normal Distributions above

Further, the density of   corresponds to the product of two independent Chi-square samples  each with two DoF.  Writing these as scaled Gamma distributions  then, from the Gamma products below, the density of the product is

Independent complex-valued noncentral normal distributions
The product of non-central independent complex Gaussians is described by O’Donoughue and Moura and forms a double infinite series of modified Bessel functions of the first and second types.

Gamma distributions
The product of two independent Gamma samples, defining , follows

Beta distributions
Nagar et al. define a correlated bivariate beta distribution

where

Then the pdf of Z = XY is given by

where  is the Gauss hypergeometric function defined by the Euler integral

Note that multivariate distributions are not generally unique, apart from the Gaussian case, and there may be alternatives.

Uniform and gamma distributions
The distribution of the product of a random variable having a uniform distribution on (0,1) with a random variable having a gamma distribution with shape parameter equal to 2, is an exponential distribution. A more general case of this concerns the distribution of the product of a random variable having a beta distribution  with a random variable having a gamma distribution: for some cases where the parameters of the two component distributions are related in a certain way, the result is again a gamma distribution but with a changed shape parameter.

The K-distribution is an example of a non-standard distribution that can be defined as a product distribution (where both components have a gamma distribution).

Gamma and Pareto distributions
The product of n Gamma and m Pareto independent samples was derived by Nadarajah.

See also
 Algebra of random variables
Sum of independent random variables

Notes

References

Types of probability distributions
Algebra of random variables